Humanitarian Initiative Just Relief Aid (HIJRA) is an African humanitarian organization focused on the implementation of emergency and resilience programming in the greater Horn of Africa; Somalia, Kenya and Uganda.

Background and administration 

Humanitarian Initiative Just Relief Aid (HIJRA) is an international African humanitarian and development organization that aims to positively contribute towards improving the living standards and conditions of those adversely affected by disasters and conflict in the Horn and East Africa. The organization roots are in Somalia, where a devastating humanitarian crisis emerged after the collapse of the Somali state in 1991. This prompted a group of like minded professionals to come together to form the organization in response to the glaring humanitarian needs.

Humanitarian Initiative Just Relief Aid (HIJRA) is an African humanitarian organization focused on the implementation of emergency and resilience programming in the greater Horn of Africa; Somalia, Kenya and Uganda.

HIJRA works to implement water, sanitation and hygiene (WASH); health; education; and livelihood projects, addressing immediate needs at the grassroots level. Program components include the construction of water and sanitation facilities, hygiene promotion, cash distribution, primary healthcare including communicable disease control, and preventative as well as maternal and child healthcare.

HIJRA is an immediate responder working to provide impartial assistance. As such, the organization works to ensure the safety of its beneficiaries and staff by adhering to a strict policy of transparency, neutrality and accountability.

HIJRA is one of the largest organisations in South Central Somalia, providing aid to over 371,000 of the region's most vulnerable.

Actions 

HIJRA is an emergency response organization. HIJRA endeavors to provide the best care possible, employing the SPHERE standards before entering new program areas. HIJRA supports community development by hiring locally, drawing staff from local regions, encouraging beneficiaries to participate in program development.

Methods 
HIJRA is a direct implementer.  The majority of its staff comes from its program areas, supported by a smaller number of equally significant international staff. In 2011, HIJRA worked through 126 staff to deliver lifesaving programs in Somalia, Kenya and Uganda. Members and staff of HIJRA make a commitment to the following values:

 Professionalism
 Equality and justice
 Transparency
 Independence and neutrality

HIJRA focuses its work on bridging gaps in aid through strategic partnerships participating in consortiums, working groups and clusters, serving as one of six NGOs in the Somalia Humanitarian Country Team.

Water, sanitation and hygiene 

HIJRA's programmes in Water, Sanitation and Hygiene (WASH) focus on increasing access to water, sanitation and hygiene services, while building the capacity to manage WASH interventions at the local level.

HIJRA's programmes in Somalia and Uganda directly benefits over 400,000 community members: refugees, Internally Displaced Persons (IDPs) and other vulnerable host community.

Water and sanitation-related diseases, such as diarrhea and malaria, remain the leading cause of death among children under age five. This is primarily due to a high proportion of non-functioning water supply facilities, poor access to sanitation and low adoption rates of positive hygiene practices.

The overall goal of the organization's programmes achieve reductions in water and sanitation-related illnesses within the communities we serve in Somalia and Uganda by:

 - Increasing access to safe water
 - Improving sanitation
 - Improving hygiene behaviour
 - Training and mobilizing community water and sanitation (WASH) committees

Livelihoods 
HIJRA's livelihood programming in Somalia and Uganda largely aims to contribute to improved resilience and increased adaptive capacities of communities and households to protect their livelihoods over continuing shocks.

Programme Outcomes:

 - Improved access to productive livelihood for enhanced food access;
 - Protection of livelihood assets through the establishment of social safety nets;
 - Improved capacities of communities to respond to and cope with recurrent shocks stressors.

Programme Activities:

 - Conducting participatory, in-depth,vulnerability assessments and systems analysis at community level;
 - Promote sustainable production and diversification of income through beneficiary training and enhancing household community assets;

Health 
HIJRA's programmes address the health needs of the poor and marginalized communities in South Central Somalia.

Some of the key focus areas are reduction in maternal and infant mortality, reducing malnutrition, construction of new and rehabilitation of existing health infrastructure, training of community health-care workers, provision of medical equipment essential drugs and immunization.

Besides this, HIJRA is also involved in disease surveillance and response.

An innovative and holistic approach has been integral to HIJRA's health strategy.
The cornerstone has been building interlinkages amongst the various stakeholders. HIJRA's training of and sensitization of community health workers has improved access, as well as quality of health within the communities we serve.

HIJRA services for the poor and marginalized, especially newborns, children, adolescent girls and mothers. Long term behaviour changes including inculcating positive health practices are increasingly evident within the communities.

Protection 
HIJRA's protection programming targeting refugees in western Uganda, envisages a
community that is able to be self-reliant in the provision of protection for the
vulnerable including unaccompanied, separated children and those at risk of abuse, exploitation and neglect as well as a continued reduction of the SGBV incidences.

HIJRA has been able to improve the access of Persons-of-Concern to legal assistance through the provision of probono legal services such as legal representation, facilitating of witnesses and interpreters to court in addition to other legal services.

The programme has also played a role in reducing crime by conducting community
policing sessions within and around the Settlement and sensitizing the communities on the laws of Uganda.

The programme has facilitated the establishment of a well-organized community with security structures that are able to prevent, detect and report crime to relevant authorities; by mean of strengthening of community-based structures along with the capacity building of the several authorities such as police and the Refugee Welfare Committee members in charge of defense. Dialogue meetings and community policing were emphasized to ensure peaceful coexistence between host community and refugees

Communications and advocacy 
As a humanitarian group, HIJRA has a duty to protect its beneficiaries from violence and abuse by speaking out about violations of humanitarian rights in an attempt to bring these abuses to the world's attention.

HIJRA takes an active role in information exchange by working to support advocacy efforts at the local and international level, ensuring its community's voice is reflected in the development of policy documents, programming and media.

HIJRA is conscious of the risks associated in the collection of such information ensuring its receipt through the employment of skilled professionals, and encourages groups and communities to speak out only when appropriate.

Funding and accountability 
HIJRA is a non-profit organization which relies on public, private and government funding.

HIJRA receives 90% of its program funds from donors. Funds collected are earmarked into general program
themes and distributed at the country level.

HIJRA strives to operate efficiently and to minimize fundraising and administrative costs. In compliance with donor regulations, HIJRA allocates the bulk of funding to direct program costs allowing 5% for indirect expenditures.

HIJRA receives funding from DFID and CIDA through its OXFAM partnership, the Common Humanitarian Fund and the Jolie-Pitt Foundation. HIJRA receives in-kind support from the World Health Organization (WHO), the United Nations Children's Fund (UNICEF) and the Rotary.

The organization further works to ensure the appropriate use of funds and program development through representation on the Somalia Humanitarian Country Team (HCT) and in relevant UN clusters, consortiums and working groups.

References 

https://policy-practice.oxfam.org.uk/publications/using-mobile-phones-for-polio-prevention-in-somalia-an-evaluation-of-the-201314-552890
https://www.alnap.org/system/files/content/resource/files/main/east-africa-somalia-en-jan16.pdf
https://www.researchgate.net/publication/323324142_The_Proactive_Engagement_of_Oxfam_International_as_International_Non-Governmental_Organization_INGO_to_Solve_Somalia_Food_Insecurity_Problem
https://www.humanitarianresponse.info/sites/www.humanitarianresponse.info/files/documents/files/150204_3W_Operational_Activities_Somalia_Districts_A3.pdf
https://www.unicef.org/esaro/UNICEF-FN-Somalia-Mobile-low-res.pdf
http://mptf.undp.org/document/download/5471
https://reliefweb.int/sites/reliefweb.int/files/resources/Oxfam%20in%20Somalia%20Drought%20Response%20External%20Update%20May%202012.pdf
https://oxfamilibrary.openrepository.com/bitstream/handle/10546/552890/er-using-mobile-phone-polio-prevention-somalia-200515-en.pdf?sequence=1&isAllowed=y
http://www.aljazeera.com/video/africa/2012/12/20121220175750944676.html
http://www.huffingtonpost.com/2011/10/10/brad-pitt-and-angelina-jo_n_1004048.html

External links 
https://reliefweb.int/organization/hijra
https://www.idealist.org/en/nonprofit/295d9e29f41a4955bbd982881b2ef616-humanitarian-initiative-just-relief-aid-nairobi
https://www.devex.com/organizations/humanitarian-initiative-just-relief-aid-hijra-55481
https://www.chsalliance.org/about/our-members/humanitarian-initiative-just-relief-aid-hijra/
https://www.fuzu.com/company/humanitarian-initiative-just-relief-aid-hijra
https://www.developmentaid.org/#!/organizations/view/47307/humanitarian-initiative-just-relief-aid-hijra
https://preventgbvafrica.org/member/humanitarian-initiative-just-relief-aid/
http://www.findglocal.com/KE/Nairobi/170109109677162/Humanitarian-Initiative-Just-Relief-Aid
https://issuu.com/hijra

Charities based in Kenya
Non-profit organisations based in Somalia